John Robert Meakins ( – October 14, 1979) was a Canadian football player who played for the Calgary Stampeders. He previously played at Montana State University and was from Edmonton, Alberta where he attended Eastwood School and Victoria High School. Later attending the University of Alabama where he earned additional bachelors and masters' degrees, he later became the academic dean at Georgia Military College in Milledgeville, Georgia. He died in 1979 at the age of 44.

References

1979 deaths
1930s births
Players of Canadian football from Ontario
Canadian football ends
American football ends
Canadian players of American football
Montana State Bobcats football players
Calgary Stampeders players